AFC Wimbledon is an English professional association football club, currently based in Merton, Greater London. The club was formed on 30 May 2002 by supporters of Wimbledon Football Club, led by Kris Stewart, Marc Jones and Trevor Williams who strongly opposed the decision of an independent commission appointed by The Football Association to allow the relocation of Wimbledon F.C. to Milton Keynes, to be subsequently renamed as Milton Keynes Dons.

AFC Wimbledon was accepted into the Premier Division of the Combined Counties League for the 2002–03 season. The club's average home attendance at league fixtures for their first season exceeded 3,000 – higher than the average attendance in the same season of Wimbledon F.C., who were still playing in the First Division (now the Football League Championship). AFC Wimbledon have also set a record for the longest run of unbeaten league games at any level of men's semi-professional or professional football in the United Kingdom. The team remained unbeaten for 78 league matches between 22 February 2003 (a 2–0 defeat at home to Withdean 2000) and 4 December 2004 (a 2–0 defeat at Cray Wanderers).

The club went on to achieve 5 promotions in 9 seasons, ensuring that they were the first club to be formed in the 21st century to achieve Football League status, and making them the youngest of the 72 Football League clubs. On 30 May 2016, AFC Wimbledon achieved their 6th promotion to Football League One after victory in the 2016 Football League Two play-off Final, exactly 14 years to the day since the club's formation.

Key
The Division is shown in italics when it changes due to promotion, relegation or league reorganisation.

Key to league record
P = Games played
W = Games won
D = Games drawn
L = Games lost
F = Goals for
A = Goals against
Pts = Points
Pos = Final league position

Key to rounds
QR2 = Qualifying round 2
QR3 = Qualifying round 3
QR4 = Qualifying round 4
Prelim = Preliminary round
R1 = Round 1
R1S = Round 1 Southern Section
R2 = Round 2
R3 = Round 3

R4 = Round 4
R5 = Round 5
R6 = Round 6
QF = Quarter-finals
SF = Semi-finals
RU = Runners-up
W = Winners
N/A = Did not compete

Key to goalscorers
  = Number of league goals scored

Seasons

Notes
A.  AFC Wimbledon were defeated 2–1 by Fisher Athletic in the Isthmian League Premier Division play-off semi-final on 2 May 2006, preventing the club from achieving three back-to-back promotions.
B.  AFC Wimbledon were deducted 3-points and fined £400 (reduced from an 18-point deduction on appeal) for the fielding of Jermaine Darlington who had not been registered correctly by the club as he required 'international clearance' in order to be transferred from the Football Association of Wales to the Football Association of England and had therefore played in three matches whilst still ineligible. The 'Darlington affair' also resulted in expulsion from the Surrey Senior Cup and the FA Trophy that season. 
C.  AFC Wimbledon were defeated 1–0 by Bromley in the Isthmian League Premier Division play-off semi-final on 1 May 2007. 
D.  AFC Wimbledon beat Staines Town 2–1 in the Isthmian League Premier Division play-off final on 3 May 2008.
E.  AFC Wimbledon beat Luton Town 4–3 in a penalty shoot-out after the match had ended 0–0 in extra time in the 2011 Conference National play-off Final on 21 May 2011.
F.  AFC Wimbledon were deducted 3 points and given a £5,000 fine suspended for one year by a Football Disciplinary Commission hearing for the ineligible fielding of Jake Nicholson in a 4–3 win over Cheltenham Town on 22 March 2014. In addition the club was required to pay the costs of the hearing. It was found that the player's multiplicity contract had in fact expired on 19 March 2014 and had not been renewed on that date due to the illness of a key member of the club's administrative staff.
G.  AFC Wimbledon beat Plymouth Argyle 2–0 in the 2016 Football League Two play-off Final on 30 May 2016.
H.  AFC Wimbledon finished the season with a 1.00 PPG (35 points in 35 matches) which finished them in 20th position above Tranmere Rovers by 0.06 PPG after League One voted to curtail the season following months of postponement due to the COVID-19 pandemic.

References

Further reading
 

 
Wimbledon, AFC